This is a list of compositions by the American composer Amy Beach (1867–1944), mostly issued under the name Mrs. H.H.A. Beach.

Opera
 Cabildo (N.B. Stephens), solo  voices, chorus, speaker, violin, cello, piano, 1932; Athens, Georgia, 27 Feb 1945, Op. 149

Orchestral (including with voice)
 Eilende Wolken, Segler die Lüfte (F. von Schiller), alto, orchestra, 1892, vocal score (1892), Op. 18
 Bal masque, performed 1893, version for piano (1894), Op. 22
 Gaelic Symphony, e, 1894–6, full score (1897), Op. 32
 Piano Concerto, c♯, 1899, arr. 2 piano (1900), Op. 45
 Jephthah's Daughter (Mollevaut, after Bible: Judges xi.38, It. trans., I. Martinez, Eng. trans., A.M. Beach), soprano, orchestra, vocal score (1903), Op. 53

Chamber
 Romance, violin, piano (1893), Op. 23
 Violin Sonata, a, 1896 (1899), transcr. viola, piano; transcr. flute, piano; Op. 34
 Three Compositions, violin, piano (1898), arr. cello (1903): La captive, Berceuse, Mazurka, Op. 40/1
 Invocation, violin, piano/organ, cello obbligato (1904), Op. 55
 Piano Quintet, f♯, 1907, Op. 67
 Theme and Variations, flute, string quartet, 1916 (1920), ed. J. Graziano, American Chamber Music, Three Centuries of American Music, viii (1991), Op. 80
 Caprice, The Water Sprites, flute, cello, piano, 1921, The Water Sprites arr. piano
 String Quartet, 1 movement, 1929, ed. A.F. Block, Music of the United States of America, iii (Madison, WI, 1994), Op. 89
 Pastorale, flute, cello, piano, 1921, arr. cello, organ, arr. cello, piano, Op. 90
 Prelude, violin, cello, piano, 1931 [frag.]
 Lento espressivo, violin, piano, Op. 125
 Piano Trio, 1938 (1939), Op. 150
 Pastorale, woodwind quintet (1942), Op. 151

Solo piano

 Valse Caprice, Op. 4 (1889)
 Ballade, Op. 6 (1894)
 Sketches, Op. 15 (1892)
 Bal Masque, Op. 22 (1894)
 Children's Carnival Op. 25 (1894)
 Three Pieces, Op. 28 (1894)
 Children's Album, Op. 36 (1897)
 Scottish Legend and Gavotte Fantastique, Op. 54 (1903)
 Variations on Balkan Themes, Op. 60 (1904)
 Four Eskimo Pieces, Op. 64 (1907)
 Suite Francaise, Op. 64 (1905)
 Prelude and Fugue, Op. 81 (1914)
 From Blackbird Hills, Op. 83 (1922)
 Fantasia Fugata, Op. 87 (1917)
 Far Hills of Eire, O, Op. 91 (1923)
 Hermit Thrush at Eve, at Morn, Op. 92 (1922)
 From Grandmother's Garden, Op. 97 (1922)
 Farewell Summer, Dancing Leaves, Op. 102 (1924)
 Old Chapel by Moonlight, Op. 106 (1924)
 Nocturne, Op. 107 (1924)
 A Cradle Song of the Lonely Mother, Op. 108 (1914)
 Tyrolean Valse Fantaisie, Op. 116 (1924)
 From Six to Twelve, Op. 119 (1932)
 Three Pieces, Op. 128 (1932)
 Out of the Depths, Op. 130 (1932)
 Five Improvisations, Op. 148 (1938)
 A Bit of Cairo (c. 1928)

Choral

Sacred choral
(4 voices and organ, unless stated otherwise)
 Mass, E♭, 4 voices, orchestra, 1890, orchestral score (1890), Op. 5
 Graduale (Thou Glory of Jerusalem), tenor, orchestra, piano score (1892) [addition to Mass, Op.5]
 O praise the Lord, all ye nations (Ps cxvii) (1891), Op. 7
 Choral Responses (1891): Nunc dimittis (Bible: Luke ii.29), With prayer and supplication (Bible: Philippians iv.6–7), Peace I leave with you (Bible: John iv.27), Op. 8/1
 Festival Jubilate (Ps c), D, 7 voices, orchestra, 1891, piano score (1892), Op. 17
 Bethlehem (G.C. Hugg) (1893), Op. 24
 Alleluia, Christ is risen (after M. Weisse, C.F. Gellert, T. Scott, T. Gibbons) (1895), arr. with violin obbligato (1904), Op. 27
 Teach me thy way (Ps lxxxvi.11–12), 1895, Op. 33
 Peace on earth (E.H. Sears) (1897), Op. 38
 Help us, O God (Pss lxxix.9, 5; xlv.6; xliv.26), 5 voices (1903), Op. 50
 A Hymn of Freedom: America (S.F. Smith), 4 voices, organ/piano (1903), rev. with text O Lord our God arise (1944), Op. 52
 Service in A, alto, soprano, alto, tenor, bass, 4 voices, organ: Te Deum, Benedictus (1905), rev. omitting Gloria, 1934; Jubilate Deo; Magnificat; Nunc dimittis (1906), Op. 63
 All hail the power of Jesus' name (E. Perronet), 4 voices, organ/piano, 1914 (1915), Op. 74
 Thou knowest, Lord (J. Borthwick), tenor, bass, 4 voices, organ (1915), Op. 76
 Canticles (1916): Bonum est, confiteri (Ps xcii. 1–4), soprano, 4 voices, organ; Deus misereatur (Ps lxvii); Cantate Domino (Ps xcviii); Benedic, anima mea (Ps ciii), Op. 78/1
 Te Deum, f, tenor, male chorus 3 voices, organ, 1921 (1922), Op. 84
 Constant Christmas (P. Brooks), soprano, alto, 4 voices, organ (1922), Op. 95
 The Lord is my shepherd (Ps xxiii), female chorus 3 voices, organ (1923), Op. 96
 I will lift up mine eyes (Ps cxxi), 4 voices (1923), Op. 98
 Benedictus es, Domine, Benedictus (Bible: Luke i.67–81), bass, 4 voices, organ (1924), Op. 103/1
 Let this mind be in you (Bible: Philippians ii.5–11), soprano, bass, 4 voices, organ (1924), Op. 105
 Lord of the worlds above (I. Watts), soprano, tenor, bass, 4 voices, organ (1925), Op. 109
 Around the Manger (R. Davis), 4 voices, organ/piano (1925), version for 1v, piano/organ (1925); rev. female chorus 3 voices, organ/piano (1925), rev. female chorus 4 voices, organ/piano (1929), Op. 115
 Benedicite omnia opera Domini (Bible: Daniel iii.56–8) (1928), Op. 121
 Communion Responses: Kyrie, Gloria tibi, Sursum corda, Sanctus, Agnus Dei, Gloria, soprano, alto, tenor, bass, 4 voices, organ (1928), Op. 122
 Agnus Dei, SA, chorus, organ/piano (1936) [suppl. to Op.122]
 The Canticle of the Sun (St Francis), soprano, mezzo-soprano, tenor, bass, 4 voices, orchestra, 1924, orchestral score (1928), Op. 123
 Evening Hymn: The shadows of the evening hours (A. Procter), soprano, alto, 4 voices, 1934 (1936), Op. 125/2
 Christ in the universe (A. Meynell), alto, tenor, 4 voices, orchestra, orchestral score (1931), Op. 132
 Four Choral Responses (J. Fischer) (1932), Op. 133
 God is our stronghold (E. Wordsworth), soprano, 4 voices, organ, Op. 134
 Hearken unto me (Bible: Isaiah li.1, 3; xliii.1–3; xl.28, 31), soprano, alto, tenor, bass, 4 voices, orchestra, orchestral score (1934), Op. 139
 O Lord, God of Israel (Bible: 1 Kings viii.23, 27–30, 34), soprano, alto, bass, 4 voices, 1935, Op. 141
 Lord of all being (O.W. Holmes) (1938), Op. 146
 I will give thanks (Ps cxi), soprano, 4 voices, organ (1939), Op. 147
 Hymn: O God of love, O King of peace (H.W. Baker), 4 voices, 1941 (1942)
 Pax nobiscum (E. Marlatt), (female chorus 3 voices)/(male chorus 3 voices/4vv), organ (1944)

Secular choral
 The Little Brown Bee (M. Eytinge), female chorus 4 voices (1891), Op. 9
 Singing Joyfully (J.W. Chadwick), children's chorus 2 voices, piano
 The Minstrel and the King: Rudolph von Habsburg (F. von Schiller), tenor, bass, male chorus 4 voices, orchestra, piano score (1890), Op. 16
 Wouldn't that be queer (E.J. Cooley), female chorus 3 voices, piano (1919) [arr. of song], Op. 26/4
 An Indian Lullaby (anon.), female chorus 4 voices (1895)
 The Rose of Avon-Town (C. Mischka), soprano, alto, female chorus 4 voices, orchestra, piano score (1896), Op. 30
 Three Flower Songs (M. Deland), female chorus 4 voices, piano (1896): The Clover, The Yellow Daisy, The Bluebell, Op. 31/1
 Fairy Lullaby (W. Shakespeare), female chorus 4 voices (1907), Op. 37/3
 Three Shakespeare Choruses, female chorus 4 voices, piano (1897): Over hill, over dale, Come unto these yellow sands, Through the house give glimmering light, Op. 39/1
 Song of Welcome (H.M. Blossom), 4 voices, orchestra, orchestral score (1898), Op. 42
 Far Awa' (R. Burns), female chorus 3 voices, piano (1918) [arr. of song], Op. 43/4
 The year's at the spring (R. Browning), female chorus 4 voices, piano (1909); Ah, love, but a day (Browning), female chorus 4 voices, piano (1927), Op. 44/1
 Sylvania: a Wedding Cantata (F.W. Bancroft, after W. Bloem), soprano, S, alto, tenor, bass, 8 voices, orchestra, piano score (1901), Op. 46
 A Song of Liberty (F.L. Stanton), 4 voices, orchestra, 1902, piano score (1902), arr. male chorus 4 voices, piano (1917), Op. 49
 Juni (E. Jensen), 4 voices, piano (1931), version for female chorus 3 voices (1931) [arr. of song], Op. 51/3
 Shena Van (W. Black), female chorus 3 voices/male chorus 4 voices (1917) [arr. of song], Op. 56/4
 Only a Song (A.L. Hughes), One Summer Day (Hughes), female chorus 4 voices (1904), Op. 57/1
 The Sea-Fairies (A. Tennyson), soprano, alto, female chorus 2 voices, orchestra, organ ad lib, 1904, piano score (1904), arr. harp, piano, Op. 59
 The Chambered Nautilus (Holmes), soprano, alto, female chorus 4 voices, orchestra, organ ad lib, piano score (1907), ed. A.F. Block (Bryn Mawr, PA, 1994), Op. 66
 Panama Hymn (W.P. Stafford), 4 voices, orchestra, arr. 4 voices, organ/piano (1915), Op. 74
 The Candy Lion (A.F. Brown), Dolladine (W.B. Rands), female chorus 4 voices (1915) [arrs. of songs], Op. 75/1
 Friends (Brown), children's chorus 2 voices (1917)
 Balloons (L.A. Garnett) children's chorus (1916)
 Dusk in June (S. Teasdale), female chorus 4 voices (1917), Op. 82
 May Eve, 4 voices, piano, 1921 (1933), Op. 86
 Three School Songs, 4 voices (1933), Op. 94
 Peter Pan (J. Andrews), female chorus 3 voices, piano (1923), Op. 101
 The Greenwood (W.L. Bowles), 4 voices (1925), Op. 110
 The Moonboat (E.D. Watkins), children's chorus (1938), Who has seen the wind (C. Rossetti), children's chorus 2 voices (1938), Op. 118/1
 Sea Fever (J. Masefield), The Last Prayer, male chorus 4 voices, piano (1931), Op. 126/1
 When the last sea is sailed (Masefield), male chorus 4 voices (1931), Op. 127
 Drowsy Dream Town (R. Norwood), soprano, female chorus 3 voices, piano (1932), Op. 129
 We who sing have walked in glory (A.S. Bridgman), 1934 (1934), Op. 140
 This morning very early (P.L. Hills), female chorus 3 voices, piano, 1935 (1937), Op. 144
 The Ballad of the P.E.O. (R.C. Mitchell) female chorus, 1944

Songs
(for single voice and piano, unless stated otherwise)
 Four Songs: With violets (K. Vannah) (1885), Die vier Brüder (F. von Schiller) (1887), Jeune fille et jeune fleur (F.R. Chateaubriand) (1887), Ariette (P.B. Shelley) (1886), Op. 1/1
 Three Songs: Twilight (A.M. Beach) (1887), When far from her (H.H.A. Beach) (1889), Empress of night (H.H.A. Beach) (1891), Op. 2/1
 Songs of the Sea (1890): A Canadian Boat Song (T. Moore), soprano, bass, piano; The Night Sea (H.P. Spofford), soprano, S, piano; Sea Song (W.E. Channing), soprano, S, piano, Op. 10/1
 Three Songs (W.E. Henley): Dark is the night (1890), The Western Wind (1889), The Blackbird (1889), Op. 11/1
 Three Songs (R. Burns): Wilt thou be my dearie? (1889) Ye banks and braes o' bonnie doon (1891), My luve is like a red, red rose, 1887 (1889), Op. 12/1
 Hymn of Trust (O.W. Holmes) (1891), rev. with violin obbligato (1901), Op. 13
 Four Songs, 1890 (1891): The Summer Wind (W. Learned), Le secret (J. de Resseguier), Sweetheart, sigh no more (T.B. Aldrich), The Thrush (E.R. Sill); nos.2–3 rev. (1901), Op. 14/1
 Three Songs (1893): For me the jasmine buds unfold (F.E. Coates), Ecstasy (A.M. Beach), 1v, piano, violin obbligato, Golden Gates, Op. 19/1
 (Villanelle) Across the World (E.M. Thomas) (1894), arr. 1v, cello obbligato, Op. 20
 Three Songs (1893): Chanson d'amour (V. Hugo), arr. 1v, orchestra, arr. 1v, cello obbligato (1899), Extase (Hugo), Elle et moi (F. Bovet), Op. 21/1
 Four Songs (1894): My Star (C. Fabbri), Just for this (Fabbri), Spring (Fabbri), Wouldn't that be queer (E.J. Cooley); no.4 arr. chorus (1919), Op. 26/1
 Four Songs, 1894 (1895): Within thy heart (A.M. Beach), The Wandering Knight (anon., Eng. trans., J.G. Lockhart), Sleep, little darling (Spofford), Haste, O beloved (W.A. Sparrow), Op. 29/1
 Four Songs, 1896 (1897): Nachts (C.F. Scherenberg), Allein! (H. Heine), Nähe des Geliebten (J.W. von Goethe), Forget-me-not (H.H.A. Beach), Op. 35/1
 Three Shakespeare Songs (1897): O mistress mine, Take, O take those lips away, Fairy Lullaby; no.3 arr. chorus (1907), Op. 37/1
 Three Songs (1898): Anita (Fabbri), Thy beauty (Spofford), Forgotten (Fabbri), Op. 41/1
 Five Burns Songs (1899): Dearie, Scottish Cradle Song, Oh were my love yon lilac fair!, Far awa', My lassie; no.3 arr. 2 soprano, piano (1918); no.4 arr. chorus (1918), arr. 2 voices (1918), arr. female  voices (1918), arr. organ, 1936, arr. piano, 1936, Op. 43/1
 Three [R.] Browning Songs (1900): The year's at the spring, Ah, love but a day, I send my heart up to thee; no.1 arr. soprano, alto, piano (1900), arr. chorus (1928), arr. female  voices (1928), arr. 1v, piano, violin (1900), arr. male chorus, piano (1933); no.2 arr. alto, bass, piano (1917), arr. soprano, tenor, piano (1917), arr. 1v, piano, violin (1920), arr. chorus by H. Norden (1949), nos.1–2 arr. chorus (1927), Op. 44/1
 Four Songs (1902): Come, ah come (H.H.A. Beach), Good Morning (A.H. Lockhart), Good Night (Lockhart), Canzonetta (A. Sylvestre), Op. 48/1
 Four Songs (1903): Ich sagete nicht (E. Wissman); Wir drei (H. Eschelbach), Juni (E. Jansen), Je demande à l'oiseau (Sylvestre); no.3 arr. voice, piano, violin (1903), arr. 1v, orchestra, arr. chorus (1931), Op. 51/1
 Four Songs, 1903–4 (1904): Autumn Song (H.H.A. Beach), Go not too far (F.E. Coates), I know not how to find the spring (Coates), Shena Van (W. Black); no.4 arr. chorus (1917), arr. with violin obbligato (1919), Op. 56/1
 Give me not love (Coates), soprano, tenor, piano (1905), Op. 61
 When soul is joined to soul (E.B. Browning) (1905), Op. 62
 After (Coates) (1909), arr. violin, cello, arr. alto, chorus, 1936, arr. soprano, alto, chorus, organ, 1936, Op. 68
 Two Mother Songs (1908): Baby (G. MacDonald), Hush, baby dear (A.L. Hughes), Op. 69/1
 Three Songs (1910): A Prelude (A.M. Beach), O sweet content (T. Dekker), An Old Love-Story (B.L. Stathem), Op. 71/1
 Two Songs (1914): Ein altes Gebet, perf. 1914, Deine Blumen (L. Zacharias), Op. 72/1
 Two Songs (Zacharias) (1914): Grossmütterchen, Der Totenkranz, Op. 73/1
 The Candy Lion (A.F. Brown), A Thanksgiving Fable (D. Herford), Dolladine (W.B. Rands), Prayer of a Tired Child (Brown) (1914); nos.1, 3 arr. female chorus (1915), Op. 75/1
 Two Songs (1914): Separation (J.L. Stoddard), The Lotos Isles (Tennyson), Op. 76/1
 Two Songs (1916): I (C. Fanning), Wind o' the Westland (D. Burnett), Op. 77/1
 Three Songs (1917): Meadowlarks (I. Coolbrith), Night Song at Amalfi (Teasdale), In Blossom Time (Coolbrith), Op. 78/1
 A Song for Little May (E.H. Miller), 1922
 The Arrow and the Song (H.W. Longfellow), 1922
 Clouds (F.D. Sherman), 1922
 In the Twilight (Longfellow) (1922), Op. 85
 Spirit Divine (A. Read), soprano, tenor, organ (1922), Op. 88
 Message (Teasdale) (1922), Op. 93
 Four Songs (1923): When Mama Sings (A.M. Beach), Little Brown-Eyed Laddie (A.D.O. Greenwood), The Moonpath (K. Adams), The Artless Maid (L. Barili), Op. 99/1
 Two Songs (1924): A Mirage (B. Ochsner); Stella viatoris (J.H. Nettleton), soprano, violin, cello, piano, Op. 100/1
 Jesus my Saviour (A. Elliott) (1925), Op. 112
 Mine be the lips (L. Speyer) (1921), Op. 113
 Around the Manger (Davis), 1v, piano/organ (1925), also version for chorus, Op. 115
 Three Songs (M. Lee) (1925): The Singer, The Host, Song in the Hills, Op. 117/1
 Birth (E.L. Knowles), 1926
 Rendezvous (Speyer), 1v, violin obbligato (1928), Op. 120
 Mignonnette (1929)
 Springtime (S.M. Heywood) (1929), Op. 124
 Two Sacred Songs: Spirit of Mercy (anon.) (1930), Evening Hymn: The shadows of the evening hours (A. Procter) (1934); no.2 arr. chorus (1936), Op. 125/1
 Dark Garden (Speyer) (1932), Op. 131
 To one I love (1932), Op. 135
 Fire and Flame (A.A. Moody), 1932 (1933), Op. 136
 Baby (S.R. Quick); May Flowers (Moody); 1932 (1933), Op. 137/1
 Evening song, 1934
 April Dreams (K.W. Harding), 1935
 The Deep Sea Pearl (E.M. Thomas), 1935
 I sought the Lord (anon.), 1v, organ, 1936 (1937), Op. 142
 I shall be brave (Adams) (1932), Op. 143
 Dreams, Op. 145
 Though I Take the Wings of Morning (R.N. Spencer), 1v, organ/piano (1941), Op. 152
 The heart that melts
 The Icicle Lesson
 If women will not be inclined
 Time has wings and swiftly flies
 Whither (W. Müller) [after Chopin: Trois nouvelles études, no.3]
 Du sieh'st, bass, piano [fragment]

References

 

Beach, Amy